Jesper Worre, (born 5 June 1959) is a former Danish professional bicycle racer and a former director of the Danmarks Cykle Union (DCU) by the board of directors.

Biography 
Worre competed in the team time trial event at the 1980 Summer Olympics.

He was a professional between 1982 and 1992 and took part in the 1989 Tour de France, finishing 88th in the general classification.

Worre has once been tested positive for amineptine in 1992, he confessed to the use of doping, receiving a conditional suspension. Amineptine is a mild but pleasant stimulant and a fast-acting mood-brightener. Amineptine had been on the doping list for a couple of months before Worres confession of using amineptine, and was removed again from the list of banned performance-enhancing drugs shortly after. Worre was caught a doping a second time, making him the only Danish rider aside from Kim Andersen to be caught doping multiple times.

Ironically, Worre now promotes himself for his strong and uncompromising struggle against the use of doping in professional cycling, in both media and in the Danish cycling federation (DCU).

Doping 
 1992: Jesper Worre found guilty of the abuse of amineptine during competition.

Road honours 

1977
  Junior road Champion of Denmark

1980
  Champion of Denmark in amateur teams- mountains

1983
 Giro del Veneto
 third in the GP Industria & Artigianato di Larciano

1984
 Stage 1, Tirreno–Adriatico

1985
 Prologue of the Danmark Rundt
 second in the GP Industria & Artigianato di Larciano

1986
 Danmark Rundt
 third in the Grand Prix Eddy Merckx

1987
 second in the Gran Premio Città di Camaiore

1988
 Stages 3 and 7, Tour of Sweden
 Tour of Sweden
 Tour of the Americas

1990
 Stage 6, Vuelta a España

1991
 Stage 11, Vuelta a la Argentina

Track honours

World championships 
Colorado Springs 1986
  Individual pursuit

Vienna 1987
  Individual pursuit

Gand 1988
  Individual pursuit

References

External links 
 

1959 births
Living people
Danish male cyclists
Danish Vuelta a España stage winners
Danish sportspeople in doping cases
Doping cases in cycling
Danish track cyclists
Danmark Rundt winners
Sportspeople from Frederiksberg
Olympic cyclists of Denmark
Cyclists at the 1980 Summer Olympics